Maram Susli (Arabic: مرام سوسلي), also known as Mimi al-Laham, PartisanGirl, Syrian Girl and Syrian Sister, is a Syrian Australian conspiracy theorist, YouTube content creator, and political commentator who prepares videos on the Syrian Civil War, United States foreign policy in the Middle East, and the Gamergate controversy.

She has defended the Syrian government of Bashar al-Assad and criticised ISIS and Syrian rebels. She has contributed to the online pseudo-academic SVR-run disinformation and propaganda journal New Eastern Outlook, the conspiracy website InfoWars, and Russian and Iranian government propaganda outlets RT and Press TV, and occasionally contributed to Al Mayadeen.  She has published in the Duginist Journal of Eurasian Affairs, as well as numerous far-right and neo-Nazi podcasts and media networks.

Early life and activities 
Susli was born in Damascus; her family moved to Australia when she was a child. She studied chemistry at the University of Western Australia and has a science degree in biophysics and chemistry.

Susli's series of video and social media commentaries on her YouTube channel had over 30,000 subscribers and close to 2.5 million views in 2014.

Interviews and opinions 
Susli began writing and speaking on the Syrian Civil War in 2012. Susli said she speaks out against Syrian rebels, ISIS and the United States after becoming dismayed at seeing her country destroyed. One of her YouTube videos, If Syria Disarms Chemical Weapons We Lose the War, was viewed 44,720 times by October 2014. Jordanian news outlet Al Bawaba described Maram as fighting for the future of her country towards what she believes as the best case scenario. "Susli's conviction that the best and only future for the Syrian people can exist with Bashar Al Assad at the helm, flanked by his Russian and Iranian allies, is dispiriting." In a 2013 interview on RT with Abby Martin in 2013 (as Mimi al Laham), Susli said that it would be a "grave mistake" for Assad to renounce chemical weapons. As well as RT, Susli is a contributor to the Iranian Press TV. and New Eastern Outlook.

In an interview with Alex Jones on InfoWars, following the Ghouta chemical attack of August 2013, she implied the rebels were responsible for the massacre. Susli said the Syrian government was a corrupt dictatorship and that there was "a legitimate reason for people to want to create ... change". She stated that the US and NATO used the anger of the Syrian people to serve their own agendas.

In a 2014 Vice interview she said she wanted Syria to "remain secular, united and strong" and did not "tolerate foreigners destroying our way of life, forcing us to live a certain way. Whether it's ISIS or the US government".

In an interview with The Daily Beast in 2014, Susli said that she does not support President Bashar al-Assad or associates of the Syrian Ba'ath party. According to the website she said this "[d]espite her trolling over Assad's enemies, despite her appearances on Assad-friendly media outlets, and despite her connections to pro-Assad hackers." In one video she said groups like the "New World Order" have targeted Assad's Syria because it does not allow genetically modified crops and lacks "a Rothschild central bank". According to The Daily Beast Susli said the Houla massacre in 2012 was the work of British intelligence.

According to The Daily Beast, Susli has a positive opinion of Hezbollah. Over the Israeli-Palestinian conflict, she said "I don't even believe in a two-state solution," instead suggesting there should be "a one-state solution". In Susli's opinion, the New World Order opposes the Syrian government. She has said that the Freemasons and the Illuminati collaborate with the governments of the United States and Israel, as well as NATO, in international events; that Al-Qaeda and the Islamic State of Iraq and the Levant (ISIS) are a single front organisation of the Central Intelligence Agency (CIA); that 9/11 was an inside job; that ebola is possibly part of the United States biological weapons program; and that the United States Department of Defense secretly manipulated the Gamergate controversy. Via her Twitter account in June 2021, she linked to an article suggesting 9/11 was the responsibility of "Zionists".

In 2014, News Corp Australia Network said Susli was a "self-described News Personality" whose Facebook page is "filled with video posts on the current conflict, criticising IS and Syrian rebels". She has denied the allegations of atrocities and war crimes against the Assad government. "People are dying, and I have a duty as a human being and as someone of Syrian origin to expose the truth about why", Susli told MailOnline in 2014.

In 2017, along with Theodore Postol, Susli rejected claims that the Syrian government has used chemical weapons in 2017 at Khan Shaykhun. In a YouTube video, she referred to evidence posted by Postol, suggesting that Khan Shaykhun chemical attack, alleged to have killed 74 people, was not the work of the Assad regime. While interviewing Seymour Hersh for Prospect magazine, Steve Bloomfield said that Postol "spoke about how he relies for his work on Syria on ... Susli". Hersh replied that "He talked to her once on one thing". In an article for Alex Jones' InfoWars website, Susli said the White Helmets, the first responder group, had been responsible for the Khan Shaykhun attack. Postol's reliance on Susli's reputed expertise has been found to be seriously flawed by Cheryl Rofer, a chemical weapons expert consulted by Bellingcat.

After the Skripal poisonings in Salisbury, England in March 2018, Susli's Twitter account posted 2,300 times over a 12-day period, accessed by 61 million users. Analysts from the UK government briefed selected journalists that they had concluded Susli's twitter account (@partisangirl) was "suspicious and part of a broader disinformation campaign". The Guardian newspaper then described her account as being a "Russian bot", but subsequently changed its article by substituting "account" for "bot". Susli, in response, said: "I am not a robot; I am a human being." A fact check by Channel 4 concluded that Susli is a "real individual", remarking that Twitter had issued her account with a verification tick confirming the account is authentic and that the claim that her account is a bot "controlled directly by the Kremlin, appears to be false".

She is a supporter of the Syrian Social Nationalist Party.

References

External links 

 
 

1987 births
Living people
9/11 conspiracy theorists
Australian anti–Iraq War activists
Australian conspiracy theorists
Australian political commentators
Australian women bloggers
Syrian bloggers
Syrian women bloggers
Syrian conspiracy theorists
Syrian emigrants to Australia
People from Damascus